Under Attack is the thirteenth studio album by the German thrash metal band Destruction, released on 13 May, 2016.

Album title and lyrics 
Regarding the title track, vocalist Marcel "Schmier" Schirmer said: "I think we are all under attack, it all starts with our mobile phones and our computers, (...) We are a hi-tech society, Under Attack was (...) a perfect title for showing the state of the earth, we're definitely going to have a lot of problems in the future if we don't wake up soon and chase some stuff. We always change stuff when it's too late!"

The lyrics on the song Second to None deal with cyber bullying and harassment, especially over the internet.

Track listing 

All songs written by Schmier and Sifringer, except track 11 (written by Conrad "Cronos" Lant, Jeffrey "Mantas" Dunn and Anthony "Abaddon" Bray) and track 12 (written by Schmier, Sifringer and Sandmann).

Personnel

Destruction 
Schmier – bass, vocals
Mike Sifringer – guitars
Wawrzyniec "Vaaver" Dramowicz – drums

Additional personnel 
Alex Camargo – vocals on "Black Metal"
Martin Buchwalter – engineering
VO Pulver – production, mixing, mastering
Gyula Havancsák – artwork

Charts

References 

2016 albums
Destruction (band) albums
Nuclear Blast albums